iO, or iO Chicago, (formerly known as "ImprovOlympic") is an improv theater and training center in central Chicago, with a former branch in Los Angeles, called iO West and in Raleigh, North Carolina called iO South. The theater taught and hosted performances of improvisational comedy. It was founded in 1981 by Del Close and Charna Halpern. The theater has many notable alumni, including Amy Poehler and Stephen Colbert.

The theatre closed briefly in 2020, though the building was purchased in 2021 and reopened on November 3, 2022.

Description
iO concentrated on "long-form" improvisational structures, in contrast to the "short-form" or "improv game" format of Theatresports, ComedySportz or the television show Whose Line Is It Anyway? The iO's signature piece is the "Harold", and the theater featured other forms of improvisation, as well as sketch comedy and stand-up comedy.

The building had four performance spaces:
 The Del Close Theater - This was the second-largest of iO's theaters, and was located on the ground floor of the building. It hosted some of iO's premiere shows, such as Virgin Daiquiri, The Improvised Shakespeare Company, and The Deltones.
 The Chris Farley Cabaret - One of two cabaret-style theaters in the building, this hosted many different types of performances, mostly improvised and mostly non-Harold.
 The Jason Chin Harold Cabaret - Named after a revered teacher at iO (who died on January 8, 2015) this theater predominantly featured performances of the Harold from house teams at the theater which specialized in that form.
 The Mission Theater - The largest theater at iO, formerly run and managed by T. J. Jagodowski and David Pasquesi (AKA "TJ and Dave") featured some of iO's most iconic and longest-running shows such as The Armando Diaz Theatrical Experience and Hootenanny, The Musical Armando, and Whirled News Tonight.

History

The ImprovOlympic was created in 1981 putting competing teams of comedic improvisers on stage in front of audiences. This was the brainchild of David Shepherd who originally created the format in 1972 in New York with Howard Jerome. David Shepherd used the Theater Games, created earlier by Viola Spolin,  as a way for teams to compete. The first ImprovOlympic classes and shows took place at The Players Workshop in Chicago, where Charna Halpern was an improv student. Charna Halpern became David Shepherd's assistant, and eventually the producer of the competitions. There were also competitions at a network of local bars and clubs.

In 1982, the ImprovOlympic moved from The Players Workshop to its own space at Thomas Goodman's CrossCurrents theatre, 3207 N. Wilton Street. Teams began to form out of every major improv troupe in Chicago. Shows began shifting to a long-form approach by 1983.

In 1995, the ImprovOlympic moved to its location on Clark St. in Chicago.

An additional theater, iO West was opened by Paul Vaillancourt in Los Angeles, California in 1997. It was managed by Colleen Doyle and Zach Huddleston, before closing in 2018.

In 2001, the International Olympic Committee legally threatened the theater over its use of the name "ImprovOlympic" and the name was subsequently changed to "iO." On September 2, 2005, iO held its 25th anniversary show at the Chicago Theatre in downtown Chicago. The wireless microphones went dead shortly into the show, but the improvisers rallied and played using wired mics for the rest of the performance. Celebrity veterans of the iO program who returned to play included Mike Myers, Tim Meadows, Amy Poehler, and Ike Barinholtz. The opening to the Harold piece performed was conducted by the most veteran iO house team The Reckoning. "Masters of the Harold" and "Stand outs" a DVD of The Reckoning is included in the book Art By Committee a sequel to Truth in Comedy.

In August 2014, after almost 20 years in Chicago's Wrigleyville neighborhood, Charna Halpern bought a building in the Lincoln Park neighborhood and moved the iO Theater to its new home at 1501 N. Kingsbury St.

On June 18, 2020, it was announced that iO would be closing permanently. Controversy ensued regarding whether the closure was due to financial difficulties or allegations of racism that had emerged in the form of an online petition that began circulating only a few days before. Halpern stressed that the reasons were strictly financial, highlighting the property taxes bills of nearly $100,000 that "would have had to come out of her personal savings" as the theater was not making any income as a result of the COVID-19 pandemic and acknowledging that, if not for the pandemic, she would not be closing. "I'm 68 years old," she said. "It's scary for me. We're in a pandemic right now and there's no end in sight. Even if we were able to open at half capacity it was not going to work."

In July 2021 the theater was bought by Scott Gendell and Larry Weiner of Chicago. The duo intend to resume shows and classes and the theater officially reopened on November 3, 2022.

Notable alumni
This includes people who have performed or taught at either iO West or iO Chicago:

Stephen Colbert
Chris Farley
Tina Fey
Kate Flannery
Bill Hader
Seth Meyers
Mike Myers
Amy Poehler
Jason Sudeikis
Vince Vaughn
Bob Odenkirk
Scott Adsit
Vanessa Bayer
Matt Besser
Maria Blasucci
Paul Brittain
Kipleigh Brown
Aidy Bryant
Kay Cannon
Wyatt Cenac
Andy Dick
Kevin Dorff
Rachel Dratch
Jon Favreau
Neil Flynn
Rich Fulcher
Peter Gwinn
TJ Jagodowski
Angela Kinsey
David Koechner
Steve Little
John Lutz
Jack McBrayer
Adam McKay
Tim Meadows
Susan Messing
Jerry Minor
Joel Murray
Mick Napier
Masi Oka
David Pasquesi
Danny Pudi
Andy Richter
Rick Roman
Mitch Rouse
Eric Stonestreet
Cecily Strong
Stephnie Weir

See also
 Annoyance Theatre
 The Groundlings
 The Second City
 Under the Gun Theater
 Upright Citizens Brigade

References

External links
 I.O. Chicago
 I.O. West
 Interview with iO founder, Charna Halpern, on BLACKOUTpresents: Radio

Theatres in Chicago
Arts organizations established in 1981
1981 establishments in Illinois